Camp Viking is a British military base located in Øverbygd, Norway which was established in March 2023. It will be used by the Royal Marines for Arctic training, in addition to being used as a forward operating base for UK and NATO forces operating in the Arctic and Baltic Sea regions. It will be used as an operational support hub by the Royal Navy's Littoral Response Group (North) amphibious task group.

The base is strategically located near the Norwegian Army's Skjold garrison, the Bardufoss Air Station (which is used by the Commando Helicopter Force), and a port in Sørreisa. As of 8 March 2023, approximately 1,000 Royal Marines have been deployed to the base.

Camp Viking is to remain open for ten years as Norway is opposed to foreign military bases on its soil — a long-established policy to avoid provocations with Russia. As such, the presence of Camp Viking is politically sensitive in Norway, with the Norwegian government insisting that it is not a new wholly-British military base but instead a rebranding of an existing training facility within a Norweigan military base, and therefore does not infringe its policy on foreign military bases. Nevertheless, the facility was described as a military base in a press release by the Royal Navy.

References

Royal Navy bases outside the United Kingdom
Military installations of the United Kingdom in other countries
Military installations of the United Kingdom
Norway–United Kingdom relations